Gongylolepis jauaensis is a species of flowering plant in the family Asteraceae. It is a tall shrub, with leaves borne in a rosette at the top of the stem, and is only found in the tepui highlands of Maigualida, Marahuaka and northern Amazonas Region (Venezuela). It is pollinated by bats.

References

External links
Jstor.org: Isotype specimen of Gongylolepis jauaensis

Stifftioideae
Endemic flora of Venezuela
Guayana Highlands
Plants described in 1972
Flora of the Tepuis